Applied Spectroscopy Reviews is a peer reviewed scientific journal that publishes review articles on all aspects of spectroscopy.

Abstracting and indexing 
The journal is abstracted and indexed by the Science Citation Index and Current Contents/Physical, Chemical & Earth Sciences.

External links 
 

Chemistry journals
Optics journals
Taylor & Francis academic journals
Bimonthly journals
Publications established in 1967
English-language journals